Nenjam Marappathillai may refer to:
 Nenjam Marappathillai (1963 film)
 Nenjam Marappathillai (2021 film)
 Nenjam Marappathillai (TV series)